Dominic Burke (c. 1639 – 1 January 1704) was an Irish Roman Catholic bishop who served as the Bishop of Elphin from 1671 to 1704.

References

1630s births

1704 deaths
Roman Catholic bishops of Elphin
Year of birth unknown
Year of birth uncertain